Tore Strindberg (19 February 1882 – 6 February 1968) was a Swedish sculptor. His work was part of the sculpture event in the art competition at the 1932 Summer Olympics.

References

1882 births
1968 deaths
20th-century Swedish sculptors
Swedish male sculptors
Olympic competitors in art competitions
Artists from Stockholm
Tore